The Progressive Canadian Party fielded sixteen candidates in the 2004 federal election, none of whom were elected.  Information about these candidates may be found here.

Ontario

Derrall Bellaire (London—Fanshawe)

Bellaire is a longtime resident of London, Ontario and has been politically active for several years.  He was involved with the former Progressive Conservative Party of Canada,  serving as president of the London-Fanshawe Association for a number of years and running as the party's candidate in the 2000 federal election.  He has also been involved with the Progressive Conservative Party of Ontario and has assisted members of London City Council in running for office.

Bellaire continued to work within the Progressive Conservative Party of Canada after the 2000 election, and was involved in the party's 2003 by-election campaign in Perth—Middlesex that saw the final election of a Progressive Conservative candidate at the national level.  He opposed ratification of the deal that ultimately dissolved the party into a merger with the Canadian Alliance, and assisted with the revival of the PC Party name as the Progressive Canadian Party.

Jim Conrad (Oak Ridges—Markham)
Conrad received 820 votes, finishing fifth in a field of six candidates.  The winner was Lui Temelkovski of the Liberal Party.  See Conrad's biography page for more information.